Carposina crinifera is a moth of the family Carposinidae. It was first described by Lord Walsingham in 1907. It is endemic to the Hawaiian islands of Oahu and Molokai.

References

Carposinidae
Endemic moths of Hawaii
Biota of Oahu
Biota of Molokai
Moths described in 1907
Taxa named by Thomas de Grey, 6th Baron Walsingham